The Green Institute is an Australian public policy think tank founded in 2008. The institute "supports green politics through education, action, research and debate".

In disclosure returns lodged with the Australian Electoral Commission, the institute indicated that it is an associated entity of the Australian Greens. The institute is similar to the Liberal Party aligned Menzies Research Centre and Labor's Chifley Research Centre.

Activities
 Holding events to discuss issues within green politics.
 Publishing reports as well as "opinion pieces, blog posts, podcasts".
 Publishing of the journal "The Green Agenda"

In 2017, the Green Institute published a paper in favour of a universal basic income.

Funding
The Green Institute is supported by the Commonwealth Government through a grant in aid administered by the Department of Finance.

See also
 Menzies Research Centre
 Chifley Research Centre

References

Think tanks based in Australia
Australian Greens
Think tanks established in 2008